The Piano Sonata No. 14 in C-sharp minor, marked Quasi una fantasia, Op. 27, No. 2, is a piano sonata by Ludwig van Beethoven. It was completed in 1801 and dedicated in 1802 to his pupil Countess Julie "Giulietta" Guicciardi. The popular name Moonlight Sonata goes back to a critic's remark after Beethoven's death. The verbatim translation would actually be "Moonshine Sonata". 

The piece is one of Beethoven's most popular compositions for the piano, and it was a popular favourite even in his own day.  Beethoven wrote the Moonlight Sonata in his early thirties, after he had finished with some commissioned work; there is no evidence that he was commissioned to write this sonata.

Names
The first edition of the score is headed Sonata quasi una fantasia ("sonata almost a fantasy"), the same title as that of its companion piece, Op. 27, No. 1. Grove Music Online translates the Italian title as "sonata in the manner of a fantasy". "The subtitle reminds listeners that the piece, although technically a sonata, is suggestive of a free-flowing, improvised fantasia."

Many sources say that the nickname Moonlight Sonata arose after the German music critic and poet Ludwig Rellstab likened the effect of the first movement to that of moonlight shining upon Lake Lucerne. This comes from the musicologist Wilhelm Lenz, who wrote in 1852: "Rellstab compares this work to a boat, visiting, by moonlight, the remote parts of Lake Lucerne in Switzerland. The soubriquet Mondscheinsonate, which twenty years ago made connoisseurs cry out in Germany, has no other origin." Taken literally, "twenty years" would mean the nickname had to have started after Beethoven's death. In fact Rellstab made his comment about the sonata's first movement in a story called Theodor that he published in 1824: "The lake reposes in twilit moon-shimmer [Mondenschimmer], muffled waves strike the dark shore; gloomy wooded mountains rise and close off the holy place from the world; ghostly swans glide with whispering rustles on the tide, and an Aeolian harp sends down mysterious tones of lovelorn yearning from the ruins." Rellstab made no mention of Lake Lucerne, which seems to have been Lenz's own addition. Rellstab met Beethoven in 1825, making it theoretically possible for Beethoven to have known of the moonlight comparison, though the nickname may not have arisen until later.

By the late 1830s, the name "Mondscheinsonate" was being used in German publications and "Moonlight Sonata" in English publications. Later in the nineteenth century, the sonata was universally known by that name.

Many critics have objected to the subjective, romantic nature of the title "Moonlight", which has at times been called "a misleading approach to a movement with almost the character of a funeral march" and "absurd". Other critics have approved of the sobriquet, finding it evocative or in line with their own interpretation of the work. Gramophone founder Compton Mackenzie found the title "harmless", remarking that "it is silly for austere critics to work themselves up into a state of almost hysterical rage with poor Rellstab", and adding, "what these austere critics fail to grasp is that unless the general public had responded to the suggestion of moonlight in this music Rellstab's remark would long ago have been forgotten." Donald Francis Tovey thought the title of Moonlight was appropriate for the first movement but not for the other two.

Carl Czerny, Beethoven's pupil, described the first movement as "a ghost scene, where out of the far distance a plaintive ghostly voice sounds".

Liszt described the second movement as "a flower between two abysses".

Form

Although no direct testimony exists as to the specific reasons why Beethoven decided to title both the Op. 27 works as Sonata quasi una fantasia, it may be significant that the layout of the present work does not follow the traditional movement arrangement in the Classical period of fast–slow–[fast]–fast. Instead, the sonata possesses an end-weighted trajectory, with the rapid music held off until the third movement. In his analysis, German critic Paul Bekker states: "The opening sonata-allegro movement gave the work a definite character from the beginning ... which succeeding movements could supplement but not change. Beethoven rebelled against this determinative quality in the first movement. He wanted a prelude, an introduction, not a proposition".

The sonata consists of three movements:

I. Adagio sostenuto

The first movement, in C minor and alla breve, is written in modified sonata-allegro form. Donald Francis Tovey warned players of this movement to avoid "taking [it] on a quaver standard like a slow ".

The movement opens with an octave in the left hand and a triplet figuration in the right. A melody that Hector Berlioz called a "lamentation", mostly by the left hand, is played against an accompanying ostinato triplet rhythm, simultaneously played by the right hand. 
The movement is played pianissimo (pp) or "very quietly", and the loudest it gets is piano (p) or "quietly".

The adagio sostenuto tempo has made a powerful impression on many listeners; for instance, Berlioz commented that it "is one of those poems that human language does not know how to qualify". Beethoven's student Carl Czerny called it "a nocturnal scene, in which a mournful ghostly voice sounds from the distance". The movement was very popular in Beethoven's day, to the point of exasperating the composer himself, who remarked to Czerny, "Surely I've written better things".

In his book Beethoven's pianoforte sonatas, 
the renowned pianist Edwin Fischer suggests that this movement of this sonata is based on Mozart's "Ah Soccorso! Son Tradito" of his opera Don Giovanni, which comes just after the Commendatore’s murder. He claims to have found, in the archives of the Wiener Musikverein, a sketch in Beethoven's handwriting of a few lines of Mozart's music (which bears the same characteristic triplet figuration) transposed to C minor, the key of the sonata. "In any case, there is no romantic moon-light in this movement: it is rather a solemn dirge", writes Fischer.

II. Allegretto

The second movement is a relatively conventional scherzo in triple time, with the first section of the scherzo not repeated. It is a seeming moment of relative calm written in D major, the more easily notated enharmonic equivalent of C major, the parallel major of the first movement's key, C minor. Franz Liszt is said to have described the second movement as "a flower between two chasms". The slight majority of the movement is in piano (p), but a handful of sforzandos (sfz) and fortepianos (fp) helps to maintain the movement's cheerful disposition. 
This movement is described by many as the least popular movement, as most people recognize the first movement and the third movement more.

III. Presto agitato

The stormy final movement (C minor), in sonata form and common time, is the weightiest of the three, reflecting an experiment of Beethoven's (also carried out in the companion sonata Opus 27, No. 1 and later on in Opus 101), namely, placement of the most important movement of the sonata last. The writing has many fast arpeggios/broken chords, strongly accented notes, and fast alberti bass sequences that fall both into the right and left hands at various times. An effective performance of this movement demands lively and skillful playing, great stamina, and is significantly more demanding technically than the 1st and 2nd movements.  

Of the final movement, Charles Rosen has written "it is the most unbridled in its representation of emotion. Even today, two hundred years later, its ferocity is astonishing".

Beethoven's heavy use of sforzando (sfz) notes, together with just a few strategically located fortissimo (ff) passages, creates the sense of a very powerful sound in spite of the predominance of piano (p) markings throughout.

Beethoven's pedal mark 

At the opening of the first movement, Beethoven included the following direction in Italian: "Si deve suonare tutto questo pezzo delicatissimamente e senza sordino" ("This whole piece ought to be played with the utmost delicacy and without damper[s]"). The way this is accomplished (both on today's pianos and on those of Beethoven's day) is to depress the sustain pedal throughout the movement – or at least to make use of the pedal throughout, but re-applying it as the harmony changes.

The modern piano has a much longer sustain time than the instruments of Beethoven's time, so that a steady application of the sustain pedal creates a dissonant sound. In contrast, performers who employ a historically based instrument (either a restored old piano or a modern instrument built on historical principles) are more able to follow Beethoven's direction literally.

For performance on the modern piano, several options have been put forth.

One option is simply to change the sustain pedal periodically where necessary to avoid excessive dissonance. This is seen, for instance, in the editorially supplied pedal marks in the Ricordi edition of the sonata.
Half pedaling—a technique involving a partial depression of the pedal—is also often used to simulate the shorter sustain of the early nineteenth century pedal. Charles Rosen suggested either half-pedaling or releasing the pedal a fraction of a second late.
Joseph Banowetz suggests using the  sostenuto pedal:  the pianist should pedal cleanly while allowing sympathetic vibration of the low bass strings to provide the desired "blur". This is accomplished by silently depressing the piano's lowest bass notes before beginning the movement, then using the sostenuto pedal to hold these dampers up for the duration of the movement.

Influence
The C minor sonata, particularly the third movement, is held to have been the inspiration for Frédéric Chopin's Fantaisie-Impromptu, and the Fantaisie-Impromptu to have been in fact a tribute to Beethoven. It manifests the key relationships of the sonata's three movements, chord structures, and even shares some passages. Ernst Oster writes: "With the aid of the Fantaisie-Impromptu we can at least recognize what particular features of the C minor Sonata struck fire in Chopin. We can actually regard Chopin as our teacher as he points to the coda and says, 'Look here, this is great. Take heed of this example!' ... The Fantaisie-Impromptu is perhaps the only instance where one genius discloses to us – if only by means of a composition of his own – what he actually hears in the work of another genius."

Carl Bohm composed a piece for violin and piano called "Meditation", Op. 296, in which he adds a violin melody over the unaltered first movement of Beethoven's sonata.

Modern popular music pianists have included core motifs of the piece in their adaptations. Examples include George Shearing, in his 'Moonlight Becomes You,' on his White Satin album and Alicia Keys's 'Remixed & Unplugged' version of her Songs in A Minor album.

Notes and references
Notes

References

Sources

External links

 
 Analysis and recordings review of Beethoven's Moonlight Sonata, Roni's Journal, September 2007, Classical Music Blog
 Lecture by András Schiff on Beethoven's Piano Sonata Op. 27, No. 2 – via The Guardian

Scores
 
 
 Ricordi edition, The William and Gayle Cook Music Library at the Indiana University School of Music

1801 compositions
Compositions in C-sharp minor
Compositions in D-flat major
Beethoven
Piano Sonata 14
Music dedicated to family or friends